Jules Houttequiet (born 5 September 2002) is a Belgian professional footballer who plays as a left winger for Belgian Division 2 club Jong Mechelen.

Career

Mechelen
Houttequiet started his youth career with Mechelen before moving to the academy of Anderlecht. He returned to Mechelen in 2020.

Loan to Helmond Sport
On 8 August 2021, Houttequiet signed his first professional contract with Mechelen and was sent on loan to Dutch Eerste Divisie club Helmond Sport as part of the two clubs' partnership. He made his professional debut on 6 August 2021, the opening day of the 2021–22 Eerste Divisie season, where he was a starter at right wing, before being substituted off for Keyennu Lont in the second half of the 0–2 loss against FC Den Bosch at De Vliert. On 29 April 2022, he scored his first goal, which proved to be the winner in a 1–0 league victory against Jong AZ.

On 27 June 2022, Houttequiet's loan to Helmond Sport was extended for a second season. However, shortly after, before the 2022–23 season began, Houttequiet returned to Mechelen by the mutual agreement of two clubs.

Return to Mechelen
After Houttequiet's loan with Helmond Sport was terminated, he was included in the Mechelen under-23 team, Jong Mechelen, competing for the first time in the fourth-tier Belgian Division 2 in the 2022–23 season. He made his first appearance for the team on 3 September 2022, scoring a brace against Turnhout.

Career statistics

References

2002 births
People from Bornem
Footballers from Antwerp Province
Living people
Belgian footballers
Association football wingers
K.V. Mechelen players
R.S.C. Anderlecht players
Helmond Sport players
Eerste Divisie players
Challenger Pro League players
Belgian expatriate footballers
Expatriate footballers in the Netherlands
Belgian expatriate sportspeople in the Netherlands